Sacada is a genus of snout moths described by Francis Walker in 1862.

Species
In alphabetical order:
 Sacada acutipennis Strand, 1915
 Sacada approximans (Leech, 1889)
 Sacada constrictalis Ragonot, 1891
 Sacada discinota (Moore, [1866])
 Sacada fasciata (Butler, 1878)
 Sacada flexuosa Snellen, 1890
 Sacada miraculosa (Snellen, 1885)
 Sacada pallescens Hampson, 1896
 Sacada pyraliformis (Moore, 1879)
 Sacada rubralis Holland, 1900
 Sacada unilinealis Hampson, 1896

References

Pyralini
Pyralidae genera